Daniel Peter O'Brien (born 1971) is an American baseball coach who currently works in the player development department of the San Francisco Giants organization.  He was named to that position prior to the 2018 season. He previously coached Santa Clara University and the University of California, San Diego's baseball programs.

Education and minor league playing career
O'Brien played at UC San Diego, led the team in home runs, continues to rank highly on several career lists.  In his first year, he helped the team to a third-place finish in the NCAA Division III Baseball Championship.  He then served as a player/coach for one season with the independent league team Greenville Bluesmen in 1996.

Coaching career
In 1997, O'Brien became a full-time assistant at UC San Diego.  After two years, he was elevated to the top job.  After three seasons, the Tritons moved the program to Division II, joining the California Collegiate Athletic Association.  O'Brien helped establish the Tritons as a strong program in the CCAA, leading them to the College World Series in consecutive years, finishing third and second in 2009 and 2010, respectively.  He took over a struggling Santa Clara program in 2012, and has sought to rebuild it in his first two seasons.

On May 24, 2017, O'Brien resigned from Santa Clara.

Administrative career
Since resigning from field coaching, he has operated TEN90 Coaching Group, a company that specializes in baseball talent development. In 2018, San Francisco Giants then-Director of Player Development David Bell hired O'Brien to the development staff of the Giants. He has since held the title of Development Coach for the Giants.

Head coaching record

See also
List of current NCAA Division I baseball coaches

References

External links

1971 births
Living people
Greenville Bluesmen players
Santa Clara Broncos baseball coaches
UC San Diego Tritons baseball coaches
UC San Diego Tritons baseball players
Baseball first basemen
Baseball third basemen